Dolichoderus vectensis is an extinct species of the Oligocene ant in the genus Dolichoderus. Described by Donisthorpe in 1920, the fossils of the species were found in the United Kingdom.

References

Dolichoderus
Prehistoric insects of Europe
Fossil taxa described in 1920
Fossil ant taxa
Eocene species first appearances
Rupelian species extinctions